Lucinda Backwell (born 1966) is an archaeologist and a member of the Academy of Science of South Africa. She obtained her MSc in palaeoanthropology (cum laude) from the University of the Witwatersrand Medical School in 2000. Her PhD in palaeoanthropology was awarded in 2004, making her the first South African woman to be awarded a PhD in palaeoanthropology at a local institution.

In 2011, she was promoted to senior researcher at the Evolutionary Studies Institute of the University of the Witwatersrand, where she taught introductory courses on human evolution and taphonomy, and supervised postgraduates on various topics, including fossil assemblages from caves in the Cradle of Humankind. In 2017, she moved to Argentina and took up a position at CONICET. She is associated with the Grupo de Investigación en Arqueología Andina (ARQAND), Facultad de Ciencias Naturales e Instituto Miguel Lillo, Universidad Nacional de Tucumán. She has been published 50 times and has been involved in 11 documentaries. Her research interests include taphonomy, archaeology, paleontology and ethnoarchaeology.

Research interests 
 Vertebrate taphonomy and the fossil record

 Early hominin cultural and behavioural evolution
 Tracing the emergence of modern human behaviour
 Correlating archaeology, palaeontology and climate change
 Ethnoarchaeology amongst Kalahari San
 Origin(s) of ritual mortuary practice

Main fields of specialisation 
 Origin and evolution of bone tool technology

 Microscopic analysis of bone surface modifications
 San material culture, past and present

Current research 

 Border Cave, Middle Stone Age site excavation and analysis, KwaZulu-Natal, South Africa.
 Experimental taphonomy: ongoing invertebrate modification of bone in South Africa.
 Experimental taphonomy: refining the functional interpretation of early hominin bone tools; new experiments and texture analyses.
 Longitudinal studies of modern mammal carcass modification, disarticulation, dispersal and burial in a semi-arid grassland environment in South Africa.
 Description of Middle Stone Age bone artefacts from Sibudu Cave, South Africa.

 Holocene mortuary practices in Northwest Argentina.

Selected publications

Journals

Books 
 
  Proceedings of a conference in honour of Professor Phillip Tobias.

Chapters in books

Research reports 
 Backwell, L.R. 2008. Report on 2005 – 2007 excavations at Wonderkrater, a late Quaternary spring and peat mound site in Limpopo Province, South Africa. Submitted to South African Heritage Resources Agency (SAHRA).
 Backwell, L.R. 2008. Report on 2005 – 2007 excavations at Heelbo I, a large mammal mass death assemblage in Free State Province, South Africa. Submitted to South African Heritage Resources Agency (SAHRA).

Thesis and dissertation 
Backwell, L.R. 2004. Early Hominid Bone Tool Industries. PhD submitted by publications. University of the Witwatersrand and University of Bordeaux I.

Backwell, L.R. 2000. A Critical Assessment of Southern African "Early Hominid Bone Tools". Unpublished MSc. University of the Witwatersrand.

Documentaries 
 2022, San elders speak: Ancestral knowledge of the Kalahari San video archive.
 2014, YouTube documentary, the San ostrich trap.
 2013, A Shaman's Journey. The last elders [Le voyage de Kgonta Bo, le chaman]. Documentary film produced by MC4, with the participation of France Télévisions and Planète Thalassa for France 5 Television.
 2012, San material culture, PNAS.
 2008, Department of Science and Technology. Progress of Science, Human Origins Education (SABC 1)
 2004, National Geographic Society
 2003, African Solutions on SABC 3.
 2002, Cradle of Humankind World Heritage Site (Discovery Channel, Canada)

 2001, Discovery Channel (Canada)
 2001, Technologic (Summit TV, DStv Ch 412)
 2001, Cradle of Humankind World Heritage Site
 2001, Odyssey of Mankind (Zweites Deutsches Fernsehen)

Awards/recognition 
 "Best 1st year Lecturer" by Wits University School of Geosciences Geological Student Society. (2014)
 Journal of Archaeological Science Top cited article 2007–2011. (2012)
 NRF rating: C1 (valid 2012 – 2017). (2011)
 Promoted to senior researcher. (2011)
 Voted "Best Lecturer for 1st year", by Wits University School of Geosciences Geological Student Society. (2010)
 Voted "Coolest Lectures for 1st year", by Wits University School of Geosciences Geological Student Society. (2010)
 Voted "Best 1st year Lecturer", by Wits University School of Geosciences Geological Student Society. (2009)
 FEI Prize (Life Sciences) for the best paper on electron microscopy published in an international journal. *"Probable human hair found in a fossil hyaena coprolite from Gladysvale cave, South Africa." (2009)
 Science Direct, 6th most downloaded paper in first quarter for Journal of Archaeological Science. (2009)
 Top 100 Science Stories, Discover Magazine. (2008)
 Certificate of Appreciation, Life Sciences Educators, Teaching and Learning Services, Department of Education, KwaZulu-Natal, South Africa (2008)
 First South African woman to be awarded a PhD in palaeoanthropology at a local institution. (2004)
 University Postgraduate Local Merit Scholarship. (2003)
 University Council Postgraduate Scholarship. (2002)
 University Postgraduate Merit Award. (2002)
 S2A3 Medal. Presented by the South African Association for the Advancement of Science: Most distinguished master's degree in the Faculty of Science for 2000. (2001)
 Top 100 Science Stories Discover magazine: "Evidence of termite foraging by Swartkrans early hominids". Proceedings of the National Academy of Sciences. (2001)
 University Council Postgraduate Scholarship. (2001)
 Postgraduate Merit Award. (2001)
 MSc. in Palaeoanthropology (cum laude), University of the Witwatersrand Medical School. (2000)
 Postgraduate Local Merit Scholarship. (2000)
 University Postgraduate Merit Award. (2000)
 Category A Award for 2000. (200)
 Lystrosaurus Shield: Best student paper presented at the 11th Biennial Conference of the Palaeontological Society of Southern Africa.

References

External links 
 Lucinda Backwell's personal website
 
 
 

Members of the Academy of Science of South Africa
Living people
University of the Witwatersrand alumni
University of Bordeaux alumni
Academic staff of the University of the Witwatersrand
1966 births
South African archaeologists
South African women archaeologists